The 1985 Davies and Tate British Open Championships was held at the Dunnings Mills Squash Club, East Grinstead, with the later stages being held at the Wembley Conference Centre from 15 to 23 April 1985. Jahangir Khan won his fourth consecutive title defeating Chris Dittmar in the final.

Seeds

Draw and results

Final
 Jahangir Khan beat  Chris Dittmar 9-3 9-2 9-5

Section 1

Section 2

Greg Pollard (Aus) seeded fifth withdrew before the tournament started.

References

Men's British Open Squash Championships
Men's British Open Championship
Men's British Open Squash Championship
Men's British Open Squash
Men's British Open Squash Championship
Squash competitions in London